The Stranger is a 1987 Argentine-American thriller film directed by Adolfo Aristarain and starring Bonnie Bedelia, Peter Riegert, Barry Primus, Ricardo Darín and Cecilia Roth. It was written by Dan Gurskis. It was released in the United States on December 4, 1987.

Plot
A woman living in Buenos Aires (Bedelia), who is suffering from amnesia, discovers that she is the sole surviving witness to a brutal murder. Although the police can find no clues about any murder, the killers begin to hunt her.

Cast
 Bonnie Bedelia ... Alice Kildee
 Peter Riegert ... Dr. Harris Kite
 Barry Primus ... Sergeant Drake
 David Spielberg ... Hobby
 Ricardo Darín ... Clark Whistler
 Cecilia Roth ... Anita
 Julio de Grazia ... Jay
 Marcos Woinsky ... Macaw 
 Jacques Arndt ... Rhea
 Milton James ... Brandt
 Julio Kaufman ... Dr. Hobby
 Ernesto Larrese ... Lark
 Sacha Favelevic ... Robin
 Federico Luppi ... Manager
 Miguel Ángel Paludi ... Croupier
 Patricia Zangaro ... Female police officer
 Adrián Ghio ... White intruder
 Melvin Daniel ... Black man
 Arturo Maly ... Father
 Lala Sunblad ... Mother
 Nicolas Deane ... Teenage son
 Marina Magali ... Actress
 Tito Mendoza ... Hobo
 Haydée Padilla ... Desk woman
 Heidi Froseth ... Fat woman
 Sofía Viruboff ... Desk girl (as Sofia Virobof)
 Adolfo Aristarain ... Movie goer (uncredited)

References

External links 
 

1987 films
1987 thriller films
Argentine thriller films
English-language Argentine films
Films scored by Craig Safan
Columbia Pictures films
1980s English-language films
1980s Argentine films